The 1995 Extremaduran regional election was held on Sunday, 28 May 1995, to elect the 4th Assembly of the autonomous community of Extremadura. All 65 seats in the Assembly were up for election. The election was held simultaneously with regional elections in twelve other autonomous communities and local elections all throughout Spain.

The Spanish Socialist Workers' Party (PSOE) won the election, but suffered a spectacular fall in both vote share and seats, losing the absolute majority it had maintained since 1983. On the other hand, the People's Party (PP) made great gains, winning the same 8 seats lost by the PSOE and nearing 40% of the vote. United Left (IU) obtained its best historical result to date in a regional election, with 6 out of 65 seats. The Extremaduran Coalition, an alliance of United Extremadura (EU) and the Extremaduran Regionalist Party (PREx), both of which failed to enter the Assembly in the 1991 election, entered the Assembly with 1 seat.

The Democratic and Social Centre (CDS), which had already been reduced to 3 seats in 1991, did not even stand in the 1995 election, thus losing all of its seats.

Juan Carlos Rodríguez Ibarra was able to be re-elected for a fourth term in office thanks to the abstention of IU. Both PP and IU together commanded an absolute majority of seats and could potentially block the PSOE in the Assembly, as had happened in Andalusia.

Overview

Electoral system
The Assembly of Extremadura was the devolved, unicameral legislature of the autonomous community of Extremadura, having legislative power in regional matters as defined by the Spanish Constitution and the Extremaduran Statute of Autonomy, as well as the ability to vote confidence in or withdraw it from a regional president.

Voting for the Assembly was on the basis of universal suffrage, which comprised all nationals over 18 years of age, registered in Extremadura and in full enjoyment of their political rights. The 65 members of the Assembly of Extremadura were elected using the D'Hondt method and a closed list proportional representation, with an electoral threshold of five percent of valid votes—which included blank ballots—being applied in each constituency. Alternatively, parties failing to reach the threshold in one of the constituencies were also entitled to enter the seat distribution as long as they ran candidates in both districts and reached five percent regionally. Seats were allocated to constituencies, corresponding to the provinces of Badajoz and Cáceres, with each being allocated an initial minimum of 20 seats and the remaining 25 being distributed in proportion to their populations.

The electoral law provided that parties, federations, coalitions and groupings of electors were allowed to present lists of candidates. However, groupings of electors were required to secure the signature of at least 2 percent of the electors registered in the constituency for which they sought election. Electors were barred from signing for more than one list of candidates. Concurrently, parties and federations intending to enter in coalition to take part jointly at an election were required to inform the relevant Electoral Commission within ten days of the election being called.

Election date
The term of the Assembly of Extremadura expired four years after the date of its previous election. Elections to the Assembly were fixed for the fourth Sunday of May every four years. The previous election was held on 26 May 1991, setting the election date for the Assembly on Sunday, 28 May 1995.

The Assembly of Extremadura could not be dissolved before the date of expiry of parliament except in the event of an investiture process failing to elect a regional president within a two-month period from the first ballot. In such a case, the Assembly was to be automatically dissolved and a snap election called, with elected deputies merely serving out what remained of their four-year terms.

Opinion polls
The table below lists voting intention estimates in reverse chronological order, showing the most recent first and using the dates when the survey fieldwork was done, as opposed to the date of publication. Where the fieldwork dates are unknown, the date of publication is given instead. The highest percentage figure in each polling survey is displayed with its background shaded in the leading party's colour. If a tie ensues, this is applied to the figures with the highest percentages. The "Lead" column on the right shows the percentage-point difference between the parties with the highest percentages in a poll. When available, seat projections determined by the polling organisations are displayed below (or in place of) the percentages in a smaller font; 33 seats were required for an absolute majority in the Assembly of Extremadura.

Results

Overall

Distribution by constituency

Aftermath

Notes

References
Opinion poll sources

Other

1995 in Extremadura
Extremadura
Regional elections in Extremadura
May 1995 events in Europe